The County of Verdun was a sovereign medieval county in the Duchy of Lower Lorraine.

County

The rulers of the sovereign County of Verdun styled themselves as Counts by the grace of God. country was located near Lower Lotharingia within the Holy Roman Empire. The Bishopric of Verdun bordered on it from the east. The Forest of Argonne formed the western border of the county, but it also included the fortresses at Montfaucon-d'Argonne and Vienne-le-Château. According to an imperial diploma issued in 1156, Bishop Haimo of Verdun received the right to appoint counts, but the counts from the Ardennes-Bouillon dynasty made the office hereditary by the end of the 10th century.

List of counts

to 923 Ricwin, married first to the daughter of Engelram, Chamberlain to Charles the Bald, and second to Cunigunda, widow of Wigeric, Count of Bidgau
923–944 Otto, also duke of Lorraine from 940, son of Ricwin by his first marriage
944-963 Raoul, also Count of Ivois (as Rudolfe II)
963–1002 Godfrey I, called the Prisoner, son of Gothelo, Count of Bidgau, son of Wigeric and Cunigunda, and Uda of Metz; married Matilda, daughter of Herman, Duke of Saxony
1002–1012 Godfrey II, son of previous, duke of Lower Lorraine from 1012 to his death in 1023
1012–1022 Frederick, brother of previous
1022–1024 Herman (d.1029), brother of previous, retired to monastery
1024–1025 Louis, also count of Chiny, received the county from Bishop Raimbert, killed by Gothelo, brother of Herman, who took the city and gave it as an appanage to Godfrey, his son
1025–1069 Godfrey III, called the Bearded, also duke of Upper Lorraine from 1044 and Lower Lorraine from 1065, he was deprived of his possessions, Verdun included, by the Emperor Henry III, but he was reinstated and spent his life vacillating between rebellion and peace
1069–1076 Godfrey IV, called the Hunchback, son of previous, also duke of Lower Lorraine
1076–1086 Matilda of Tuscany, called la Gran Contessa, widow of previous, also marquise of Tuscany
1086–1095 Godfrey V (d.1100), nephew of Godfrey IV, also duke of Lower Lorraine from 1089 and defender of the Holy Sepulchre from 1099
unknown
1100–1105 Theodoric, also count of  Montbéliard and Bar 
1105–1134 Reginald (d.1149), called le Borgne, son of previous, also count of  Montbéliard and Bar 

In 1134, the bishop deposed Reginald and reattached the county to the episcopal demesne.

References

Sources

 

 
Verdun